Thengellavarigudem is a village 100 km from Hyderabad, India.

Villages in Ranga Reddy district